Patient zero, or the index case, is the first documented patient in a disease epidemic within a population.

Patient zero may also  refer to:

 Gaëtan Dugas (1952–1984), once considered to be the initial source of AIDS in North America, and the origin of the term "patient zero"
 Patient Zero (audio drama), based on the television series Doctor Who
 Patient Zero (film), a 2018 fantasy-horror film
 "Patient Zero" (The Outer Limits), a 2001 television episode
 Patient Zero: A Joe Ledger Novel, 2009, by Jonathan Maberry
 Patient Zero, a demoscene production by Farbrausch
Patient 0, an album by American deathcore band Enterprise Earth (together with the title track "Patient Zero")
 "Patient Zero", a song from the album Infected by the metal band HammerFall
"Patient Zero", a song from the album Mental Illness by Aimee Mann
Patient Zero, a campaign in the 2016 video game Hitman

See also 
 Zero Patience, a musical about AIDS